Kathryn Warner (born 30 June 19?? in Barrow-in-Furness, England) is an English historian and author, who mostly writes about the 14th century. Her best known work is biography of King Edward II of England.

Biography
Warner was born in Barrow-in-Furness, England, United Kingdom. She studied history and literature on the Manchester University and specialised in the 14th century.

She has written several books describing the Kingdom of England during the 14th century and is best known for her biographies of Edward II and his wife, Isabella of France.

Books 
Edward II: The Unconventional King — biography of Edward II, King of England
Isabella of France: The Rebel Queen — biography of Isabella, daughter of Philip IV and wife of Edward II
Long Live the King: The Mysterious Fate of Edward II 
Richard II: A True King's Fall — biography of King Richard II of England

Blood Roses: The Houses of Lancaster and York Before the Wars of the Roses – history of the noble families called House of York and House of Lancaster
Edward II and Hugh Despenser the Younger: Downfall of a King's Favourite — biography of Hugh Despenser the Younger, a favourite of Edward II

References

20th-century English historians
Living people
Year of birth missing (living people)
21st-century English historians
English biographers
20th-century biographers
21st-century biographers
British women historians
Women biographers
20th-century English women writers
21st-century English women writers
People from Barrow-in-Furness
Alumni of the University of Manchester
Edward II of England